Agua Santa del Yuna is a town in Duarte Province of the Dominican Republic.

Sources 
World Gazetteer: Dominican Republic – World-Gazetteer.com

Populated places in Duarte Province